The 2015 World Sambo Championships was held in Casablanca, Morocco between the 12 and 16 November 2015. This tournament included competition in both Sambo, and Combat Sambo.

Medal overview

Combat Sambo Events

References

External links 
http://www.eurosambo.com/en/competitions/2015/206/

World Sambo Championships
World Sambo Championships, 2015
2015 in sambo (martial art)